The 2005 Baylor Bears baseball team represented Baylor University in the 2005 NCAA Division I baseball season. The head coach was Steve Smith, serving his 11th year. The team played its home games at Baylor Ballpark in Waco, Texas.

Season summary 
The Bears played one of the toughest schedules in the nation and managed a 39-21 record going into NCAA postseason play. The team won the Big 12 Conference behind a 19-8 conference record and hosted an NCAA Regional in Waco. The Bears defeated UTSA, TCU, and Stanford, to progress to an NCAA Super Regional. The Clemson Tigers, out of the ACC Conference, came to Waco for the two-of-three series. The Bears lost the Saturday night game but rebounded on Sunday and Monday to advance to the 2005 College World Series.

In the CWS, the Bears were matched against the University of Texas, whom they had beaten 3 times during conference play. The Longhorns defeated the Bears in Game 1, putting Baylor into an elimination bracket with Oregon State. In an extra innings contest, the Bears defeated Oregon State, 4-3, to advance to play #1 Tulane. After being down 7-0 early in the game, Baylor scored 8 runs in the 7th, 8th, and 9th innings, including 3 runs in the 9th, to beat the highly ranked Green Wave, 8-7. In a rematch against the University of Texas, Baylor led 3-2 in the 8th inning, but fell to the Longhorns 4-3 to end the season. The strength of the 2005 team was their pitching, with a weekend rotation of Trey Taylor, Cory VanAllen, and Mark McCormick with closers Abe Woody and Ryan LaMotta. The offense was criticized heavily in the regular season for lack of power, but produced in postseason play. Many players from this team continue to play baseball.

Roster

Schedule 

! style="" | Regular Season
|- valign="top" 

|- align="center" bgcolor="#ccffcc"
| 1 || February 11 || vs  || Minute Maid Park • Houston, Texas || 8–6 || 1–0 || –
|- align="center" bgcolor="#ccffcc"
| 2 || February 12 || vs  || Minute Maid Park • Houston, Texas || 3–2 || 2–0 || –
|- align="center" bgcolor="#ccffcc"
| 3 || February 13 || at  || Minute Maid Park • Houston, Texas || 6–1 || 3–0 || –
|- align="center" bgcolor="#ffcccc"
| 4 || February 15 ||  || Baylor Ballpark • Waco, Texas || 6–9 || 3–1 || –
|- align="center" bgcolor="#ffcccc"
| 5 || February 18 ||  || Baylor Ballpark • Waco, Texas || 3–9 || 3–2 || –
|- align="center" bgcolor="#ccffcc"
| 6 || February 19 || Oral Roberts || Baylor Ballpark • Waco, Texas || 2–1 || 4–2 || –
|- align="center" bgcolor="#ccffcc"
| 7 || February 20 || Oral Roberts || Baylor Ballpark • Waco, Texas || 4–0 || 5–2 || –
|- align="center" bgcolor="#ffcccc"
| 8 || February 25 || at Arizona State || Packard Stadium • Tempe, Arizona || 3–5 || 5–3 || –
|- align="center" bgcolor="#ffcccc"
| 9 || February 26 || at Arizona State || Packard Stadium • Tempe, Arizona || 4–12 || 5–4 || –
|- align="center" bgcolor="#ccffcc"
| 10 || February 27 || at Arizona State || Packard Stadium • Tempe, Arizona || 8–7 || 6–4 || –
|-

|- align="center" bgcolor="#ccffcc"
| 11 || March 1 || at  || Roadrunner Field • San Antonio, Texas || 4–2 || 7–4 || –
|- align="center" bgcolor="#ffcccc"
| 12 || March 4 ||  || Baylor Ballpark • Waco, Texas || 2–4 || 7–5 || –
|- align="center" bgcolor="#ffcccc"
| 13 || March 5 || Long Beach State || Baylor Ballpark • Waco, Texas || 6–7 || 7–6 || –
|- align="center" bgcolor="#ccffcc"
| 14 || March 6 || Long Beach State || Baylor Ballpark • Waco, Texas || 7–1 || 8–6 || –
|- align="center" bgcolor="#ffcccc"
| 15 || March 8 ||  || Baylor Ballpark • Waco, Texas || 4–5 || 8–7 || –
|- align="center" bgcolor="#ccffcc"
| 16 || March 11 || at  || McGugin Field • Nashville, Tennessee || 9–4 || 9–7 || –
|- align="center" bgcolor="#ccffcc"
| 17 || March 12 || at Vanderbilt || McGugin Field • Nashville, Tennessee || 16–5 || 10–7 || –
|- align="center" bgcolor="#ccffcc"
| 18 || March 13 || at Vanderbilt || McGugin Field • Nashville, Tennessee || 4–1 || 11–7 || –
|- align="center" bgcolor="#ccffcc"
| 19 || March 13 ||  || Baylor Ballpark • Waco, Texas || 4–3 || 12–7 || –
|- align="center" bgcolor="#ccffcc"
| 20 || March 18 || at Texas || Disch-Falk Field • Austin, Texas || 3–2 || 13–7 || 1–0
|- align="center" bgcolor="#ccffcc"
| 21 || March 19 || Texas || Baylor Ballpark • Waco Texas || 9–1 || 14–7 || 2–0
|- align="center" bgcolor="#ccffcc"
| 22 || March 20 || Texas || Baylor Ballpark • Waco Texas || 4–3 || 15–7 || 3–0
|- align="center" bgcolor="#ccffcc"
| 23 || March 22 || at  || Bobcat Field • San Marcos, Texas || 4–3 || 16–7 || 3–0
|- align="center" bgcolor="#ffcccc"
| 24 || March 25 || at  || Allie P. Reynolds Stadium • Stillwater, Oklahoma || 1–7 || 16–8 || 3–1
|- align="center" bgcolor="#ccffcc"
| 25 || March 26 || at Oklahoma State || Allie P. Reynolds Stadium • Stillwater, Oklahoma || 6–3 || 17–8 || 4–1
|- align="center" bgcolor="#ffcccc"
| 26 || March 27 || at Oklahoma State || Allie P. Reynolds Stadium • Stillwater, Oklahoma || 2–3 || 17–9 || 4–2
|- align="center" bgcolor="#ccffcc"
| 27 || March 29 ||  || Baylor Ballpark • Waco, Texas || 10–3 || 18–9 || 4–2
|-

|- align="center" bgcolor="#ccffcc"
| 28 || April 1 ||  || Baylor Ballpark • Waco, Texas || 5–3 || 19–9 || 5–2
|- align="center" bgcolor="#ffcccc"
| 29 || April 2 || Oklahoma || Baylor Ballpark • Waco, Texas || 2–5 || 19–10 || 5–3
|- align="center" bgcolor="#ccffcc"
| 30 || April 3 || Oklahoma || Baylor Ballpark • Waco, Texas || 6–2 || 20–10 || 6–3
|- align="center" bgcolor="#ffcccc"
| 31 || April 5 || Houston || Baylor Ballpark • Waco, Texas || 3–9 || 20–11 || 6–3
|- align="center" bgcolor="#ccffcc"
| 32 || April 8 ||  || Baylor Ballpark • Waco, Texas || 8–3 || 21–11 || 7–3
|- align="center" bgcolor="#ccffcc"
| 33 || April 9 || Kansas State || Baylor Ballpark • Waco, Texas || 11–3 || 22–11 || 8–3
|- align="center" bgcolor="#ccffcc"
| 34 || April 10 || Kansas State || Baylor Ballpark • Waco, Texas || 8–4 || 23–11 || 9–3
|- align="center" bgcolor="#ffcccc"
| 35 || April 12 || at UT Arlington || Clay Gould Ballpark • Arlington, Texas || 0–2 || 23–12 || 9–3
|- align="center" bgcolor="#ccffcc"
| 36 || April 15 || at  || Hoglund Ballpark • Lawrence, Kansas || 8–4 || 24–12 || 10–3
|- align="center" bgcolor="#ccffcc"
| 37 || April 16 || at Kansas || Hoglund Ballpark • Lawrence, Kansas || 13–2 || 25–12 || 11–3
|- align="center" bgcolor="#ccffcc"
| 38 || April 17 || at Kansas || Hoglund Ballpark • Lawrence, Kansas || 3–2 || 26–12 || 12–3
|- align="center" bgcolor="#ffcccc"
| 39 || April 19 || at TCU || Lupton Stadium • Fort Worth, Texas || 1–2 || 26–13 || 12–3
|- align="center" bgcolor="#ccffcc"
| 40 || April 20 ||  || Baylor Ballpark • Waco, Texas || 4–3 || 27–13 || 12–3
|- align="center" bgcolor="#ffcccc"
| 41 || April 22 || at Nebraska || Haymarket Park • Lincoln, Nebraska || 4–8 || 27–14 || 12–4
|- align="center" bgcolor="#ccffcc"
| 42 || April 23 || at Nebraska || Haymarket Park • Lincoln, Nebraska || 4–1 || 28–14 || 13–4
|- align="center" bgcolor="#ffcccc"
| 43 || April 24 || at Nebraska || Haymarket Park • Lincoln, Nebraska || 3–4 || 28–15 || 13–5
|- align="center" bgcolor="#ccffcc"
| 44 || April 26 || UT Arlington || Baylor Ballpark • Waco, Texas || 8–5 || 29–15 || 13–5
|- align="center" bgcolor="#ccffcc"
| 45 || April 29 ||  || Baylor Ballpark • Waco, Texas || 6–1 || 30–15 || 14–5
|- align="center" bgcolor="#ffcccc"
| 46 || April 30 || Texas Tech || Baylor Ballpark • Waco, Texas || 2–3 || 30–16 || 14–6
|-

|- align="center" bgcolor="#ccffcc"
| 47 || May 1 || Texas Tech || Baylor Ballpark • Waco, Texas || 8–5 || 31–16 || 15–6
|- align="center" bgcolor="#ccffcc"
| 48 || May 3 || UTSA || Baylor Ballpark • Waco, Texas || 6–5 || 32–16 || 15–6
|- align="center" bgcolor="#ffcccc"
| 49 || May 11 || at  || Reckling Park • Houston, Texas || 0–7 || 32–17 || 15–6
|- align="center" bgcolor="#ccffcc"
| 50 || May 13 ||  || Baylor Ballpark • Waco, Texas || 10–9 || 33–17 || 16–6
|- align="center" bgcolor="#ccffcc"
| 51 || May 14 || at Texas A&M || Olsen Field at Blue Bell Park • College Station, Texas || 3–1 || 34–17 || 17–6
|- align="center" bgcolor="#ccffcc"
| 52 || May 15 || at Texas A&M || Olsen Field at Blue Bell Park • College Station, Texas || 6–4 || 35–17 || 18–6
|- align="center" bgcolor="#ccffcc"
| 53 || May 17 || Texas State || Baylor Ballpark • Waco, Texas || 7–4 || 36–17 || 18–6
|- align="center" bgcolor="#ccffcc"
| 54 || May 20 || Missouri || Baylor Ballpark • Waco, Texas || 7–5 || 37–17 || 19–6
|- align="center" bgcolor="#ffcccc"
| 55 || May 21 || Missouri || Baylor Ballpark • Waco, Texas || 4–7 || 37–18 || 19–7
|- align="center" bgcolor="#ffcccc"
| 56 || May 22 || Missouri || Baylor Ballpark • Waco, Texas || 4–10 || 37–19 || 19–8
|-

|-
! style="" | Postseason
|- valign="top"

|- align="center" bgcolor="#ccffcc"
| 57 || May 25 || vs Kansas || AT&T Bricktown Ballpark • Oklahoma City, Oklahoma || 2–1 || 38–19 || 19–8
|- align="center" bgcolor="#ccffcc"
| 58 || May 26 || vs Oklahoma State || AT&T Bricktown Ballpark • Oklahoma City, Oklahoma || 8–3 || 39–19 || 19–8
|- align="center" bgcolor="#ccffcc"
| 59 || May 28 || vs Texas || AT&T Bricktown Ballpark • Oklahoma City, Oklahoma || 9–8 || 40–19 || 19–8
|- align="center" bgcolor="#ffcccc"
| 60 || May 29 || vs Nebraska || AT&T Bricktown Ballpark • Oklahoma City, Oklahoma || 0–1 || 40–20 || 19–8
|-

|- align="center" bgcolor="#ccffcc"
| 61 || June 4 || UTSA || Baylor Ballpark • Waco, Texas || 8–3 || 41–20 || 19–8
|- align="center" bgcolor="#ccffcc"
| 62 || June 5 || TCU || Baylor Ballpark • Waco, Texas || 8–3 || 42–20 || 19–8
|- align="center" bgcolor="#ccffcc"
| 63 || June 6 ||  || Baylor Ballpark • Waco, Texas || 4–3 || 43–20 || 19–8
|-

|- align="center" bgcolor="#ffcccc"
| 64 || June 11 || Clemson || Baylor Ballpark • Waco, Texas || 2–4 || 43–21 || 19–8
|- align="center" bgcolor="#ccffcc"
| 65 || June 12 || Clemson || Baylor Ballpark • Waco, Texas || 7–1 || 44–21 || 19–8
|- align="center" bgcolor="#ccffcc"
| 66 || June 13 || Clemson || Baylor Ballpark • Waco, Texas || 6–1 || 45–21 || 19–8
|-

|- align="center" bgcolor="#ffcccc"
| 67 || June 18 || vs Texas || Johnny Rosenblatt Stadium • Omaha, Nebraska || 1–5 || 45–22 || 19–8
|- align="center" bgcolor="#ccffcc"
| 68 || June 20 || vs Oregon State || Johnny Rosenblatt Stadium • Omaha, Nebraska || 4–3 || 46–22 || 19–8
|- align="center" bgcolor="#ccffcc"
| 69 || June 21 || vs  || Johnny Rosenblatt Stadium • Omaha, Nebraska || 8–7 || 47–22 || 19–8
|- align="center" bgcolor="#ffcccc"
| 70 || June 22 || vs Texas || Johnny Rosenblatt Stadium • Omaha, Nebraska || 3–4 || 47–23 || 19–8
|-

References 

Baylor
Baylor Bears baseball seasons
College World Series seasons
Big 12 Conference baseball champion seasons
Baylor